A penalty fare, standard fare, or fixed penalty notice is a special, usually higher, fare charged because a passenger using public transport did not comply with the normal ticket purchasing rules. It should not be confused with an unpaid fares notice.
 
Typically penalty fares are incurred by passengers failing to purchase a ticket before travelling or by purchasing an incorrect ticket which does not cover their whole journey.

Penalty fares are a civil debt, not a fine, and a person whose penalty fare is paid is not considered to have committed a criminal offence. Penalty fares are used to discourage casual fare evasion and disregard for the ticketing rules without resorting to (in the case of railways in Great Britain) the drastic and costly step of prosecution under the Regulation of Railways Act 1889 or other laws dealing with theft and fraud. More egregious fare avoiders can still be prosecuted and fined or imprisoned if convicted.

Situation by country

United Kingdom

National Rail services in Great Britain

History and legal status 

Penalty fares were first introduced on British Rail's Network SouthEast services under the British Rail (Penalty Fares) Act 1989. Over time they have been extended to cover many parts of the National Rail network. Initially the penalty fare was set at £10 or twice the full single fare to the next station (whichever was higher) in addition to the full single fare for the rest of the journey. This was raised to £20 in 2005, and to £100 in 2023.
 
Penalty fares on the National Rail network are legally based on section 130 of the Railways Act 1993. The rules which govern the application of penalty fares are the Penalty Fares Rules 2002. Under these rules any passenger found to be without a valid ticket can be issued a penalty fare irrespective of whether it was their intent to travel without paying.

From January 2023, following a public consultation, the Department for Transport  increased the penalty fare to £100 in England plus the cost of the unpaid ticket, under the Railways (Penalty Fares) (Amendment) Regulations 2022. This is reduced to £50 plus the cost of the ticket if paid within 21 days.

Operation 

Penalty fares can only be issued by authorised collectors, commonly known as revenue protection inspectors (RPIs), either on the train or at the destination station. Some RPIs receive commission on each penalty issued. RPIs are different from regular train conductors, who cannot issue penalty fares. Passengers unable to pay the fare on the spot are allowed to pay within 21 days.

If a penalty fare is issued, it is a legal requirement for the passenger to provide their name and address when so required to do by the revenue protection inspector. In England it will be a legal requirement to provide a date of birth from January 2023. Refusing to do so or providing a false address is a criminal offence under the Railways (Penalty Fares) Regulations 1994.

Penalty fares cannot be issued in some circumstances, including: if passengers were unable to purchase a ticket due to faulty ticket machines or closed ticket offices, if warning notices are not displayed correctly, if the train or station is excluded from a penalty fares scheme, or if the National Rail Conditions of Carriage allow an excess fare to be paid.

RPIs can use their discretion not to give penalty fares to passengers who may have greater difficulty in purchasing tickets e.g. elderly, disabled or pregnant passengers, those with learning difficulties, or those who do not understand English.

Travellers issued with penalty fares which they believe to be unfair may appeal the fare within 21 days to an appeal service, which varies depending on the mode of transport. For National Rail services this is the Independent Penalty Fares Appeal Service which is run by Southeastern Trains.

Compulsory ticket areas 
Some penalty fares schemes include stations with compulsory ticket areas (CTAs), in which people without valid tickets or other authorities may be charged a penalty fare even if they have not travelled and if they do not intend to travel. These include Amersham, Aylesbury, Beaconsfield, Birmingham Moor Street, Birmingham Snow Hill, Chalfont and Latimer, Chorleywood, Derby, Ealing Broadway, Gerrards Cross, Greenford TfL station, Harrow on the Hill, High Wycombe, Leicester, London Marylebone, London St Pancras, Maidenhead, Nottingham, Rickmansworth, Sheffield, South Ruislip

Transport For London services 

The London Regional Transport (Penalty Fares) Act 1992 and the Greater London Authority Act 1999 allows Transport for London to charge penalty fares under similar but not identical rules to those on National Rail services.

Initially, the maximum penalty fare was set at £10 (£5 on buses and trams) or twice the full single fare to the next station (whichever is higher) in addition to the full single fare for the rest of the journey. It was later raised to £20 for all transport modes.

On 11 January 2009, it was further raised to £50 on TfL services (Docklands Light Railway, the Emirates Air Line, London Buses, Tramlink, London Overground and London Underground) although like many other civil penalties in the UK, a 50% discount is applied for early payments (within 21 days). Since 2 January 2012, all TfL modes have had a penalty fare of £80.

Light rail systems 
In addition to the London services mentioned above, penalty fares apply on several other tram and metro systems in Great Britain, including the Midland Metro, Nottingham Express Transit (NET), and the Tyne and Wear Metro (NEXUS). NET have confirmed that their penalty fares are authorised by byelaws.

Variations on the penalty fare are used by the Manchester Metrolink, which it calls a "standard fare", and by Edinburgh Trams, which calls it an "on-board fare".

Northern Ireland 

Penalty Fares on buses and trains in Northern Ireland are applied in accordance with regulations made under the Transport Act (Northern Ireland) 1967.

Scotland 

While still part of the UK, Scotland has its own legal system, and train services are overseen by a separate government body (Transport Scotland).

Abellio ScotRail, the franchise that operates most of the trains in Scotland, does not issue penalty fares. ScotRail may collect details and send a bill for a ticket, plus an administration fee, but it rarely does. Ticket inspectors are found on most trains, and passengers travelling without a ticket are expected to buy a ticket on the train.

If a passenger had the opportunity to buy a ticket before they boarded the train (the station had a ticket machine or open ticket office), ScotRail's policy is that the passenger must buy a full-priced single ticket for their journey and not buy cheaper tickets such as cheap-day returns, senior citizen's tickets or use any kind of Railcard to get a discount.

However, Scotland has many unstaffed train stations that do not have ticket machines or with ticket offices sometimes closed. Then, the full range of tickets is available on the train.

In England and Wales, holding an expired season ticket counts as travelling without a ticket, and passengers are liable to penalty fares or prosecution. In Scotland, passengers can renew season tickets on the train but only for a week. Monthly or annual season tickets are available only from staffed stations.

Republic of Ireland
Iarnród Éireann (Irish Rail) issues fixed payment notices on Dublin Area Rapid Transit (DART), Commuter light rail, and InterCity services, per the Railway Safety Act 2005 (Fixed Payment Notice) Regulations 2006. Appeals must be made within 21 days and failure to pay may lead to a criminal conviction and a fine of up to €1,000 plus the cost of the unpaid fare. In 2014, fixed penalty notices were issued to 9,885 fare evaders, of which 356 were prosecuted in the District Court.

The Luas tram service issues standard fares of €45 if paid within 14 days or €100 if paid after 14 days but before 28 days. This is regulated under Bye-Law 4 of the Light Railway (Regulation of Travel and Use) Bye-Laws 2015 S.I. No. 322 of 2015. Dublin Bus operates a similar standard fare penalty system, where a €100 penalty is reduced to €50 if paid within 21 days.

Czech Republic

In the Czech Republic, a penalty limit (maximum penalty) is stated by legislation: parallelly by the Road Transport Act (§ 18a of 111/1994 Sb.) for buses and by Rail Transport Act (§ 37 of 266/1994 Sb.) for trains, trams, trolleybuses and cableways (including aerial lifts). However, the wording of both these acts is co-ordinated. Penalty amount needs to be determined by the specific operator of the transport line or transport system in his Contractual Transport Conditions. The penalty is of private-law nature. To be not confused with public sanctions, they are called "surcharge" in legislation. River transport doesn't fall under this legal regulation, but the contractual terms are set similarly if the ferry or river line is integrated with other public transport.

Since 1 May 2013, the maximum penalty was heightened from 1000 Kč to 1500 Kč. Main operators of urban transport usually use the maximum penalty as the basic variant, although a bit belatedly. E.g. in the Prague Integrated Transport, the penalty was heightened from 1000 Kč to 1500 Kč since 1 January 2014, in the city of Ústí nad Labem since 1 January 2016, in the city of Hradec Králové since 1 January 2017 etc.

Usually, operators offer a penalty reduction for passengers: 
 who pay the fine immediately during the inspection (usually about 30−60 percent reduction)
 who have forgotten their long-term ticket or pay card at home and subsequently prove that they have purchased the fare before the inspection (e.g. in Prague, such passengers pay only a symbolic penalty 50 Kč instead of full 1500 Kč).

Since 23 October 2017, Prague announced a special 50 percent penalty discount for such fare dodgers who will additionally purchase an all-year network ticket, and the action continues for 2018 and in January 2019, this measure has become permanent. The price of the all-year network ticket is very favourable, 3650 Kč (= 10 Kč per day).

Czech Railways (České dráhy) as the main operator of railway passenger transport have the maximum penalty set to 1000 Kč, but it is reduced to 400 Kč if it is paid immediately. However, if the passenger preannounces to the conductor that he does not have a ticket, only 40 Kč handling surcharge applies. That's why the full penalty is very rarely applied. If the passenger has boarded at a stop where the ticket office is not open, the ticket can be purchased by the conductor without any surcharge.

If the penalty is not paid immediately, the passenger is required to produce valid identification documents. If such identification is not provided, the conductor is instructed to contact the police for assistance.

Germany 
Penalty fare ("erhöhtes Beförderungsentgelt") schemes in local transport (suburban rail, buses, underground trains) are administered by local transport authorities (Verkehrsverbund). The penalty fare is usually €60 or twice the ticket price (whichever is higher).

Germany's principal InterCity TOC, DB Fernverkehr, does not operate a penalty fare scheme. Instead it has ticket inspectors on all trains.

Philippines 
The penalty fare for passengers without lacking or holding invalid tickets on the Philippine National Railways' Metro Commuter Line is the maximum fare (PHP 30.00 in the Manila-Alabang route and PHP 60.00 in the Manila-Calamba route).

Hong Kong 
According to the "Conditions of Issue of Tickets" of the MTR, passengers traveling without a ticket in paid areas of MTR, are subject to a HK$500 surcharge. This includes those traveling in First Class carriages on the East Rail line without a First Class single-journey ticket or validated Octopus card.

Hungary 
The penalty fare on the Budapest Metro is set at 16,000 forint (8,000 if paid on the spot).

Russia 
In the Moscow Oblast, the penalty fare is 1,000 rubles. On railways, the penalty fare will be increased to fifty times the 10 km fare, plus the fare from the previous station to named station.

Switzerland
Switzerland operates a similar system to Germany. Long-distance trains have a ticket inspector on board who checks all tickets. The purchase of tickets on board was no longer possible after 10 December 2011. Local trains within a Tarifverbunde (local zone fare systems) use penalty fares with random checks. For example, in North-West Switzerland the penalty fare is CHF 100, but the monthly season costs CHF 75. Even with relatively infrequent ticket checks there is a financial incentive to remain legal.

Australia 

Five states run train networks: New South Wales, Victoria, Queensland, Western Australia and South Australia, and all have different penalty fares.

In New South Wales, the penalty for travelling without a valid ticket is $200, with the maximum penalty being $550.

In Victoria, passengers intercepted by authorised officers without a valid ticket are given the option of having their name and address taken and having the circumstances of their offence documented which may result in a $217 fine being mailed to their address. Passengers also have the option of purchasing a $75 on-the-spot penalty fare with their credit card or debit card, which cannot be appealed.

In Queensland, the penalty for travelling without a valid ticket is $227.

In Western Australia, the on-the-spot penalty fare cost is $100.

In South Australia, the penalty for travelling without a valid ticket is $220.

Taiwan
In Taiwan Railways Administration, anyone who caught fare evading can be charged full fare plus an extra 50% penalty fare.

In Taipei MRT, min NT$1,500.

In Kaohsiung Circular light rail, if caught fare evading, penalty fare will be 50 multiple from the normal single fare.

United States

In the New York metropolitan area, tickets sold on board the Long Island Rail Road and the Metro-North Railroad, as well as on New Jersey Transit trains, carry a surcharge. This is not described as a penalty, simply a more expensive purchase option. Some stations along these commuter lines do not have ticketing facilities in the waiting area, and passengers pay the standard fare when they purchase a ticket from a conductor.

Metra offers onboard ticket sales by conductors, but will assess a $5 penalty (along with additional costs) for traveling past the travel zone of a particular ticket, and also adds a $5 charge for any passenger buying a ticket onboard, who boarded at a station with a ticket vending machine or ticket agent on duty.

Amtrak conductors can sell tickets to customers who do not have a ticket, but there is a surcharge if the train was boarded at a station that was open and able to sell tickets.

On most local bus and rail systems, failure to purchase a ticket in advance is considered "fare evasion" which can result in a citation with a fine ranging from $100 to $500 depending on the jurisdiction. On systems relying on the honor system, inspectors will randomly check for passengers not purchasing tickets. Otherwise more serious penalties may apply for jumping turnstiles or otherwise evading fare collection systems.

Criticisms 

Most of the following criticisms have appeared in the Passenger Focus documents "Ticket to Ride" (2012)  and "Ticket to Ride - an Update" (2015)

 There has been insufficient information about penalty fares schemes at stations and on websites. Despite some improvements, the information provision is still variable.
 Rail companies comment generally that posters at stations often go unnoticed by passengers, yet they may rely on these to announce the existence of penalty fares schemes. More effective ways of conveying the information, such as on Customer Information screens (CIS), are not always used. CIS displays may tell the company that runs your train, whether it is on time, what catering facilities it has, where first class seating is located but not that penalties apply without a valid ticket.
 Passenger Focus observes that "Posters that are a critical part of the penalty-fares system can be ‘lost’ when displayed with other posters. They are also sometimes positioned a short distance from the station entry points, or angled in a way that loses impact".
 The requirement to buy a ticket before boarding a train may not be entirely obvious to those are unfamiliar with the railway and accustomed to paying onboard other forms of transport, especially if warning notices are inadequate.
 Penalty fares further complicate an already complex system of fares and penalties, and as not all TOCs have penalty fares schemes, they mean that ticketless passengers are treated differently according to which trains they are on. There are examples of trains run by different companies operating over the same stretch of route but having different policies in place for ticketless passengers.
 The penalties are sometimes disproportionate to the offence and can amount to hundreds of pounds on long-distance routes because of the doubled cost to the next station, as calculated under the rules.
 Penalty fares can be issued even if the train company has suffered no financial loss as a result of the passenger's mistake: if an invalid ticket of the same value is held.
 Penalty fares schemes as currently operated may not sufficiently differentiate between passengers who make honest mistakes and those intending to evade fares.
 Lack of consistency since similar errors by passengers can result in very different outcomes: no penalty, a penalty fare or prosecution depending on the TOC's policy and the discretion of the inspectors. There are no national guidelines to ensure consistency, and there are criticisms about shortcomings in the training of staff.
 There is usually a difference in treatment of passengers who forget their season tickets compared to those who forget their railcards. The former group are often allowed to buy another ticket and then claim a refund later upon presentation of their season ticket. However, the latter group are liable to penalty fares.
 Discretion is not always being used correctly despite being a specific requirement of penalty fares schemes. There are claimed to be cases of disabled people given penalty fares when it should not have happened.
 There have been problems with buying and collecting tickets. Some ticket machines do not display basic information about restrictions, and there have been ticket-printing problems leading to penalty fares.
 Queuing times for tickets, at some larger regional stations, were regularly being breached when Passenger Focus undertook a study in 2010.
 During appeals, administration fees are sometimes added before the outcome of the appeal.
Passenger Focus questioned whether an appeals body funded by a train company can be truly independent.
 There have been problems for people trying to appeal online, with the delays resulting in a penalty fare.
 There is a lack of transparency about how many penalties are issued and how many appeals allowed but no regular independent checks on the appeal bodies.
 The use of threats of prosecution under Railway Bylaw 18 to chase the civil debts of penalty fares has been criticised by Passenger Focus, which believes that the power given to the industry is being misused in some instances.

See also 
British Transport Police
National Rail Conditions of Carriage
London Underground ticketing

References

External links 
Department for Transport: Penalty Fares Policy
National Rail: Penalty Fares
Transport for London: Penalty fares and prosecutions (Lists the various Appeal Bodies)

Passenger rail transport in the United Kingdom
Fare collection systems in the United Kingdom

de:Beförderungserschleichung (Deutschland)#Fahrpreisnacherhebung